Denmark was present at the Eurovision Song Contest 1986, held in Bergen, Norway.

Before Eurovision

Dansk Melodi Grand Prix 1986 
The Danish national final to select their entry, the Dansk Melodi Grand Prix, was held on 22 February 1986 at the Danmarks Radio Studios in Copenhagen, and was hosted for the ninth straight time by radio and television host Jørgen de Mylius. Five regional juries across Denmark selected the winning song out of five songs that survived a semifinal round.

The winning entry was "Du er fuld af løgn", performed by Lise Haavik and composed by John Hatting.

At Eurovision
Lise Haavik performed eighteenth on the night of the contest, following Sweden and preceding Finland. At the close of the voting the song had received 77 points, placing 6th in a field of 20 competing countries. This high placing was the start of five top-ten finishes for Denmark in the Contest.

Voting

References

External links
Danish National Final 1986

1986
Countries in the Eurovision Song Contest 1986
Eurovision